Enedena is a monotypic moth genus of the family Erebidae. Its only species, Enedena punctilinea, is found in Ecuador. Both the genus and species were first described by Paul Dognin in 1914.

References

Herminiinae
Monotypic moth genera